Thomas Doonan (5 October 1922 – December 1998) was a Scottish professional footballer who played as a striker.

Career
Born in West Calder, Doonan played for Partick Thistle, Albion Rovers, Bradford City, Tranmere Rovers and Bangor City.

References

1922 births
1998 deaths
Footballers from West Lothian
Scottish footballers
Partick Thistle F.C. players
Albion Rovers F.C. players
Bradford City A.F.C. players
Tranmere Rovers F.C. players
Bangor City F.C. players
Scottish Football League players
English Football League players
Association football forwards